Kim Ou-joon (born December 4, 1968) is a South Korean journalist. He is well known for the host of a political podcast. He was the original creator of Naneun Ggomsuda and currently runs Ddanzi Ilbo's DAS Boeida and Traffic Broadcasting System's News Factory.

Filmography

Film

References

External links 
Ddanzi Ilbo's YouTube
TBS News Factory website

South Korean journalists
South Korean radio presenters
South Korean television presenters
Korean nationalists
The Hankyoreh
Hongik University alumni
People from Changwon
1968 births
Living people